Standings and results for Group A of the Regular Season phase of the 2006-07 Euroleague basketball tournament.

Tiebreakers:
Head-to-head record in matches between the tied clubs
Overall point difference in games between the tied clubs
Overall point difference in all group matches (first tiebreaker if tied clubs are not in the same group)
Points scored in all group matches
Sum of quotients of points scored and points allowed in each group match

Standings

Notes:
Dynamo win the tiebreaker over Olympiacos for second place, and a top seed in the Top 16 phase. The two teams split their group matches, but Dynamo scored 2 more points head-to-head.
Prokom win the tiebreaker over Climamio for fifth place and a Top 16 berth. The two teams split their group matches, but Prokom scored 8 more points head-to-head.

Fixtures and results

Game 1, October 25–26, 2006

Game 2, November 1–2, 2006

Game 3, November 8–9, 2006

Game 4, November 15–16, 2006

Game 5, November 22–23, 2006

Game 6, November 29–30, 2006

Game 7, December 6–7, 2006

Game 8, December 13–14, 2006

Game 9, December 20–21, 2006

Game 10, January 3–4, 2007

Game 11, January 10–11, 2007

Game 12, January 17–18, 2007

Game 13, January 24–25, 2007

Game 14, January 31 - February 1, 2007

Notes and references

Group A
2006–07 in Spanish basketball
2006–07 in French basketball
2006–07 in Turkish basketball
2006–07 in Russian basketball
2006–07 in Greek basketball
2006–07 in Italian basketball
2006–07 in German basketball
2006–07 in Polish basketball